Jens Lind may refer to:

 Jens Lind (businessman) (c. 1762 - 1821), sea captain, ship-owner, merchant, landowner, industrialist
 Jens Lind (botanist) (1874-1949), pharmacist and botanist